Sir John Chippendale "Chips" Lindley Keswick (born 2 February 1940) is a British merchant banker and member of the Keswick family who control Jardine Matheson, founded by William Jardine. He was chairman of Arsenal Football Club from June 2013 until his retirement in May 2020.

Early life and education
Part of the Keswick family business dynasty, Keswick is the son of Sir William Keswick (1903–1990) and Mary Lindley, and the grandson of Henry Keswick. He was educated at Eton College and the University of Aix-Marseilles.

Business career
Keswick was chairman of Hambros Bank from 1986 to 1998. He was a director of Arsenal Football Club from November 2005, and the chairman from August 2013, when he succeeded Peter Hill-Wood, until his retirement in May 2020.

Personal life
Kewsick married Lady Sarah Ramsay, daughter of the 16th Earl of Dalhousie, in 1966. They have three sons: David, Tobias and Adam. The family are friends of King Charles III and Camilla, the Queen Consort. Lady Sarah is one of the official "Queen's companions".

He is a member of gentleman's clubs White's and the City University Club. He has supported "Business for Sterling", and sat on the board of corporate donors to the Conservative Party. In December 2013, the pro-union group Better Together released the names of individuals who have made major donations to their funds, and Keswick was revealed to have donated £23,000 to the campaign.

He is a keen racehorse owner and hunter. 

Keswick's elder brother Henry and younger brother Simon Keswick are chairman and director of Jardine Matheson Holdings.

References

1940 births
Living people
British bankers
Arsenal F.C. directors and chairmen
Businesspeople awarded knighthoods
People educated at Eton College
Chips
Knights Bachelor